XF-73 (Exeporfinium chloride) is an experimental drug candidate. It is an anti-microbial that works via weakening bacteria cell walls. It is a potential treatment for methicillin-resistant Staphylococcus aureus (MRSA) and possibly Clostridium difficile. It is being developed by Destiny Pharma Ltd.

Structurally, it is a dicationic porphyrin.

It has completed a phase I clinical trial for nasal decolonisation of MRSA—being tested against 5 bacterial strains. It seems unlikely to cause MRSA to develop resistance to it.

In 2014, a phase 1 clinical trial for nasal administration was run.

, another phase 1 clinical trial (for nasal administration) completed recruiting in 2016 but no results have been posted.

References

Antimicrobials
Tetrapyrroles